Antoine Sicot is a contemporary French soloist singer specialising in the baroque repertoire for bass voice.

Biography 
Born in Saint-Ouen-de-Sécherouvre in Orne, Sicot worked a lot during the 1980s with the Baroque music ensemble Les Arts Florissants, spearhead of the "baroqueux" movement directed by William Christie.

He was then one of the pillars of this ensemble alongside Agnès Mellon, Jill Feldman, Monique Zanetti, Guillemette Laurens, Dominique Visse, Michel Laplénie, Étienne Lestringant, Philippe Cantor, Gregory Reinhart, François Fauché etc.

He also collaborated with the Ensemble Clément Janequin, La Chapelle Royale, the Ensemble Organum etc.

Selected discography

With Les Arts Florissants 
 1982: Antienne "O" de l'Avent by Marc-Antoine Charpentier
 1982:  H.414 by Marc-Antoine Charpentier
 1983:  H.482 by Marc-Antoine Charpentier
 1984: Médée by Marc-Antoine Charpentier
 1984: Airs de Cour by Michel Lambert
 1986: Le Reniement de saint Pierre H.424 by Marc-Antoine Charpentier
 1986: Dido and Eneas by Henry Purcell
 1987: Selva morale e spirituale by Claudio Monteverdi
 1989:  by Luigi Rossi
 1990: Le Malade imaginaire H 495 by Marc-Antoine Charpentier

With Ensemble Clément Janequin 
 1982: Le Chant des Oyseaulx by Clément Janequin
 1982: Octonaires De La Vanité Du Monde by Paschal de L'Estocart
 1984: Amours de Ronsard by Antoine de Bertrand
 1985: Fricassée parisienne on Harmonia Mundi
 1987: Die sieben Worte Jesu Christi am Kreuz by Heinrich Schütz
 1987: La Chasse by Clément Janequin
 1988: Chansons by Josquin des Prez
 1988: Messe L'homme armé et Requiem by Pierre de la Rue
 2002: Missa Et ecce terrae motus by Antoine Brumel

With La Chapelle Royale 
 1992: Missa Viri Galilei by Palestrina (Ensemble Vocal Européen de la Chapelle Royale and Ensemble Organum)

With Ensemble Organum 
 1985: Songs of the Church of Rome - Byzantine Period
 1986: Missa Pange lingua by Josquin des Prez
 1988: Chants de l'église Milanaise
 1989: Carmina Burana
 1990: The Play of the Pilgrimage to Emmaus.
 1990: Messe de Tournai
 1991: Old Roman chant
 1992: Requiem by Johannes Ockeghem
 1994: Messe de la Nativité de la Vierge
 1995: Messe de Nostre Dame by Guillaume de Machaut
 2004:  - Codex Calixtinus

References

External links 
 Antoine Sicot on Ensemble Organum
 Site de l'ensemble Les Arts Florissants
 Cantate BWV 4 - solistes: Étienne Rosset, Antoine Sicot on YouTube

People from Orne
Year of birth missing (living people)
Living people
French basses
21st-century French male opera singers
Operatic basses
20th-century French male opera singers